Ditrifa is a genus of moths of the family Tortricidae. It contains only one species, Ditrifa trifida, which is found in Venezuela.

The wingspan is 24–26 mm. The ground colour of the forewings is yellow, tinged ochreous. The strigulation, dots and veins are brownish ochreous. The markings are brownish ochreous with some browner dots. The hindwings are cream, tinged with pale brownish in the apical area, with some pale brownish dots terminally.

Etymology
The genus name is an anagram of the name of type-species. The species name refers to the shape of the uncus and is derived from trifidus (meaning divided into three branches).

See also
List of Tortricidae genera

References

External links
tortricidae.com

Euliini
Tortricidae genera
Monotypic moth genera